The 1930–31 season was Stoke City's 31st season in the Football League and the 11th in the Second Division.

Stoke experienced an average season as they finished in the same position as last season, 11th. The season was notable for the debuts of future star players Arthur Turner and Tommy Sale.

Season review

League
Stoke's overall form in the 1930–31 season improved only marginally as they again took 11th position in the Second Division. Wins of 5–0 v Swansea Town and 4–0 over Oldham Athletic were the best results at home whilst a 7–3 hammering away at relegated Reading a day to forget for Stoke supporters. Stoke also conceded five at Everton, Preston North End and Wolverhampton Wanderers.

The campaign ended with record gate receipts being taken from the final home league fixture against FA Cup winners West Bromwich Albion. A crowd of 26,064 amounting to £1,540 saw Albion win 1–0 to clinch promotion. Three debutants in 1930–31 who were later to have a big impact on the club's fortunes, were Tommy Sale, Arthur Turner and Harry Ware whilst Tom Williamson left for Norwich City in January.

FA Cup
Stoke were knocked out of the FA Cup at the first attempt after an epic cup tie against Manchester United. After a 3–3 draw at the Victoria Ground and a goalless one at Old Trafford Stoke lost 4–2 in the 2nd replay at Anfield.

Final league table

Results
Stoke's score comes first

Legend

Football League Second Division

FA Cup

Squad statistics

References

Stoke City F.C. seasons
Stoke